Sidera is a genus of crust fungi in the order Hymenochaetales. Circumscribed in 2011, the genus is characterized by species that have whitish resupinate fruit bodies, crystal rosettes on specialized hyphae, and sausage-shaped (allantoid) spores.

References

Agaricomycetes genera
Repetobasidiaceae